Michael Duncan Smither  (born 29 October 1939) is a New Zealand painter and composer.

Background
Smither was born in New Plymouth and was educated at New Plymouth Boys' High School and Elam School of Fine Arts, Auckland. While studying he worked part-time in a car spray-paint shop, an occupation which introduced Smither to the use of lacquer-based paints.

In 1959, Smither returned to New Plymouth, working part-time in arts-related jobs. His first solo exhibition was in 1961. In 1963 he married Elizabeth Harrington, who is better known as New Zealand Poet Elizabeth Smither. The two have three children, Sarah, Thomas and Joseph.

Smither separated from Elizabeth and eventually divorced.  For a few years he was married to Rachel McAlpine, a writer.
Smither now lives at Otama beach on the Coromandel Peninsula.

Smither was also influenced by Rita Angus and Lois White as he was studying. He turned to them for inspiration. Despite experiencing a minor stroke in 2014 and suffering from shingles, Michael Smither continues to paint and has no plans to  stop anytime soon. "I would rather die with my brush in my hand or boots on of whatever you like to call it. There's no attraction to me in the idea of retiring and going on long holidays overseas and stuff like that. To me, I've always had to have a quotient of art involved in whatever it is I am doing. It's either music or painting or sculpture or environmental efforts."

Work
Smither works in a variety of media - notably oils, acrylics, and screenprint - and on a variety of subjects. Domestic life is a major theme of many of his works, these scenes depicted with a rigorous yet idiosyncratic realism. A similar style is brought to his landscapes, many of which depict the Taranaki landscape around which he grew up. At least two of his paintings, The Family in the Van and Rocks with Mountain  have attained the status of iconic paintings in New Zealand. Rocks with Mountain is held by the Auckland Art Gallery. Smither notes that he sold the Family in the Van for $300 after deducting commission in the early 1970s.  It then sold in 2012 for $200,000.

In the 1960s Michael Smither  worked with his father Bill Smither producing many different screenprints. Screenprinting was not considered an "art" at this stage.  After the death of his father in 1985, Michael Smither did not produce any screenprints for several years. Mount Taranaki is a frequent image in his screenprints. Michael Smither continues to produce modestly priced screen prints alongside his paintings which continue to fetch high prices in art auctions.

Smither's paintings are characterized as being of a representational, hard-edged style. His approach has changed over the years, with his more recent works having more attention spent on the details of objects, people and places.

His first solo exhibition was in 1961.He had a major exhibition at the Christchurch Art Gallery from 18 March – 4 April 1986 and a major exhibition entitled The Wonder Years at the City Gallery in Wellington from 19 February–11 June 2006. His paintings appear in the collections of  the Auckland Art Gallery Toi O Tamaki, Te Papa Tongarewa in Wellington and the Waikato Museum amongst others

He is the patron of community art gallery "Real Tart" in New Plymouth.

Record auction results 
Michael Smither set the record for the most expensive painting sold that was painted by a living New Zealand artist when his 1967 painting entitled Sea Wall and Kingfisher sold for $342,000 in October 2019.

Also in 2019, Smither's painting of Saint Francis and the Wolf sold at auction for $240,000. The painting took almost 12 years to complete and incorporates Smither's Catholic faith, telling the story of St Francis of Assisi and a wolf that terrorized the Umbrian town of Gubbio in 1220. Saint Francis and the Wolf are sitting below ferns with the wolf staring out at the viewer while Saint Francis has his eyes closed.

A 1993 painting Large Still Life with Green Plastic Plate also sold in 2019 for $180,000. This painting of a benchtop covering with cooking implements drying with shadows cast on the bench was described as expressing "the way these rhythms [between object and space] exist equally in the details of daily life as they do in the great natural formations of land and mountains".

Michael Smither's 2001 painting of The Manifesto Café and Wine Bar, a well known venue in the 1990s on Auckland's Queen Street sold in auction in 2020 for $131,600. With its references to Edward Hoppers Nighthawks, Michael Smither describes it as a proposal of marriage between the seated couple "witnessed in a sidelong glance".

Music compositions
 21 Piano Pieces (1968–1978)
 Four Pieces for violin and viola (1974)
 Geometric Scores for piano (1975, revised 1976)
 Polyphonic Chords for four players (1980); originally intended for 4 cellos
 Cello for Pamela Gray for solo cello (1981)

House in Parnell, Auckland 
Michael Smither painted an aquatic themed mural on the staircase and entranceway to a house in Takutai Street, Parnell, over a 10-year period in the 1970s when he would come around to visit friends who lived in the house. The house (complete with the art work) sold in an auction for $4.18 million in May 2021. The new owner was "absolutely ecstatic" about the artwork.

Books
Michael Smither had many books of his art, with just one of them being Michael Smither - Painter.

Honours and awards
Smither was the recipient of the 1970 Frances Hodgkins Fellowship from the University of Otago. In the 2004 Queen's Birthday Honours, he was appointed a Companion of the New Zealand Order of Merit, for services to the arts.

References

External links
Works in the collection of the Museum of New Zealand Te Papa Tongarewa
 Michael Smither at the Centre for New Zealand Music

1939 births
Companions of the New Zealand Order of Merit
People educated at New Plymouth Boys' High School
Living people
New Zealand painters
New Zealand composers
Male composers
People from New Plymouth
People from Coromandel Peninsula
Elam Art School alumni